The CKX-TV Craig broadcasting tower is a 411.5 metre 1,350 feet-high guyed TV mast located in Hayfield, Manitoba, Canada. It is currently the second-tallest structure in Canada. The current structure is actually the second version built at the site. When the original mast was built in 1973, the CKX-TV Craig broadcasting tower matched the height of the Cape Race LORAN-C transmitter as the tallest structures in Canada. Only one structure built since then within Canada has surpassed its height: the CN Tower in Toronto. The original mast collapsed in an ice storm in 1983 and was subsequently rebuilt in 1985.

The CKX-TV Craig broadcasting tower is currently fifth in height among the tallest structures in the Commonwealth of Nations.

CKYB-TV, a rebroadcaster of CKY-DT currently transmits from the tower, after CKX-TV shut down in October 2009.

See also
List of tallest structures in Canada
List of masts

External links
 https://www.broadcasting-history.ca/listing_and_histories/television/ckx-tv

Towers in Canada